Adipose triglyceride lipase, also known as patatin-like phospholipase domain-containing protein 2 and ATGL, is an enzyme that in humans is encoded by the PNPLA2 gene. ATGL catalyses the first reaction of lipolysis, where triacylglycerols are hydrolysed to diacylglycerols.

Properties 
ATGL has very high substrate specificity for triacylglycerols. It contains a catalytic dyad using serine-aspartic acid.

Function 
ATGL catalyses the first reaction of lipolysis. It hydrolysis triacylglycerols to diacylglycerols by attacking the fatty acid attached to carbon-3 of glycerol.

ATGL acts as a control mechanism of lipolysis, as variations in diacylglycerol concentration impact enzymes in later stages of lipolysis.

Clinical significance 
Defects in ATGL can cause problems in lipolysis, leading to neutral lipid storage disease. As triacylglycerols are not hydrolysed to diacylglycerols, there is a build-up of triacylglycerol droplets in granulocytes.

ATGL is regulated by insulin, and is similar to structure with adiponutrin, a protein that is regulated by nutrition. When there is a lack of insulin, there is an increased expression of the ATGL protein. Because adipose tissue triglyceride is a major form of energy storage, the study of how ATGL regulation and dysregulation can lead to potential problems will increase understanding of the pathophysiology behind metabolic disorders. ATGL is also the key enzyme that would be able to maintain a balance between mobilization and lipid storage. Lipolytic breakdown performed by ATGL would impact regulatory functions including but not limited to cell death, growth, signaling, metabolism, and gene expression.

References

Further reading

External links